Gytis Stankevičius (born 30 July 1994) is a Lithuanian swimmer. He competed in the men's 50 metre backstroke event at the 2017 World Aquatics Championships.

References

External links
 

1994 births
Living people
Lithuanian male backstroke swimmers
Place of birth missing (living people)